Antoni Krauze (4 January 1940 – 14 February 2018) was a Polish screenwriter and director.

Early life
Antoni Krauze was born on 4 January 1940 in Warsaw, Poland. He studied filmmaking at the National Film School in Łódź (1966). He was the older brother of cartoonist and illustrator Andrzej Krauze.

Career

Krauze directed many documentaries and feature films. His 2011 film, Black Thursday won Special Award at the Polish Film Festival in 2011 and FIPRESCI Prize at the Montréal World Film Festival in 2011.

Death

Krauze died on 14 February 2018.

Filmography

Feature films

Director & screenwriter 
Palec boży, 1973
Strach, 1975 – only director (by novel Zbigniew Safjan)
Podróż do Arabii, 1979
Party przy świecach, 1980 – only director (by novel Jan Himilsbach)
Prognoza pogody, 1982
Dziewczynka z hotelu Excelsior, 1988 – only director (by novel Eustachego Rylskiego)
Radość pisania, 2005 – about Wisława Szymborska
Black Thursday, 2011 – only director
Smolensk, 2016 – about the 2010 Polish Air Force Tu-154 crash

References

External links
 

1940 births
2018 deaths
Łódź Film School alumni
Polish documentary filmmakers
Polish film directors
Polish screenwriters
Film people from Warsaw